Tenellia lizae is a species of sea slug, an aeolid nudibranch, a marine gastropod mollusc in the family Fionidae.

Distribution
This species was described from Ensenada de los Muertos, south of La Paz, Baja California Sur, Mexico.

Description 
The typical adult size of this species is 3–5 mm.

References 

Fionidae
Gastropods described in 2003